The Sin of Nora Moran is a 1933 American pre-code melodrama and proto-noir film directed by Phil Goldstone and based on the short story "Burnt Offering" by W. Maxwell Goodhue. The film is also known as Voice from the Grave (American reissue title). Since the protagonist is put to death for a crime she did not commit, some saw the film as an argument against capital punishment.

The painting for the movie poster is by Peruvian artist Alberto Vargas, who was working in the United States and later became known for his images of the "Vargas Girls".

Plot summary
Nora Moran, a young woman with a difficult and tragic past, is sentenced to die for a murder that she did not commit. She could easily reveal the truth and save her own life, if only it would not damage the lives, careers and reputations of those whom she loves.

Cast
Zita Johann as Nora Moran
John Miljan as Paulino 
Alan Dinehart as District Attorney John Grant
Paul Cavanagh as Governor Dick Crawford
Claire Du Brey as Mrs. Edith Crawford
Sarah Padden as Mrs. Watts
Henry B. Walthall as Father Ryan
Otis Harlan as Mr. Moran
Aggie Herring as Mrs. Moran
Cora Sue Collins as Nora Moran, as a Child
Joseph W. Girard as Captain of Detectives
Ann Brody as Matron
Rolfe Sedan as Stage Manager
 Otto Yamaoka as Kito (uncredited)

Soundtrack

Reception 
The Chicago Daily Tribune wrote, "It might have been gripping if it weren't so confusing."

References

External links 

1933 films
1933 crime drama films
American crime drama films
American black-and-white films
Majestic Pictures films
Films directed by Phil Goldstone
1930s English-language films
1930s American films